Rolando is a Spanish, Italian and Portuguese variant of Roland, the Frankish military hero who served under Charlemagne and whose life became the basis for the medieval French epic Chanson de Roland and various other works of European literature. The name appears most frequently as a Spanish given name. Its presence is said to be from Spain, however it has also been used in Italy, sometimes as a surname. Related names include Roland, Orlando and Roldán.

List of people with the given name Rolando 
Rolando (footballer) (born 1985), Rolando Jorge Pires da Fonseca
Rolando Aarons (born 1995), English footballer
Rolando Alarcón (1929-1973), Chilean folk musician
Rolando Bianchi (born 1983), Italian footballer
Rolando Blackman (born 1959) American basketball player
Rolando Cruz (born 1939), Puerto Rican pole vaulter
Rolando Fonseca (born 1974), Costa Rican footballer
Rolando Garibotti, Argentinian-American climber
Rolando Jurquin (born 1987), volleyball player
Rolando McClain (born 1989), American football linebacker
Rolando Mendoza, Nicaraguan athlete
Rolando Perez, American mixed martial artist
Rolando Zárate (born 1978), Argentine football player
Edson Rolando Silva Sousa (born 1983), Portuguese footballer
Rolando Gonzalez-Bunster (born c. 1949), US-based Argentine businessman

See also
Roland (disambiguation)
Rolanda
Ronaldo (name)

Italian masculine given names
Spanish masculine given names
Portuguese masculine given names